Edward Barto Gallagher (February 3, 1903 — October 1963) was a professional American football player for the New York Yankees. He attended high school in Asbury Park, New Jersey.  He attended Washington & Jefferson College.

References

 

1903 births
1963 deaths
Players of American football from Philadelphia
American football offensive tackles
American football defensive tackles
Washington & Jefferson Presidents football players
New York Yankees (NFL) players